Malagina, in later times Melangeia (Μελάγγεια), was a Byzantine district in the valley of the Sangarius river in northern Bithynia, at least overlapping the modern territory of Pamukova.

History
Malagina served as a major encampment and fortified staging area (aplekton) for the Byzantine army. It was the aplekton closest to the imperial capital of Constantinople, and, as such, of major importance during imperial expeditions to the East: it was here that the armies of the powerful themes of Anatolikon, Opsikion and Thrakesion joined the emperor. The region was also the site of the major imperial horse ranches (metata) in Asia Minor. It is first mentioned in historical sources in 798, when Empress Irene assembled an army there. Other sources state that the first mention of Malagina is in a text attributed to St. Methodius, dating from the late seventh century. The site was attacked by the Arabs in 798, 860 and in ca. 875. In the 12th century, Emperor Manuel I Komnenos restored the fortifications of the district's main fortress at Metabole, and used it as a base for his campaigns against the Seljuk Sultanate of Iconium. Under the Angeloi, it became a separate province, headed by a governor titled dux and stratopedarches. At the same time, it is attested as being an archbishopric, before being raised to a metropolis under the Laskarids.

The city is last mentioned as Byzantine in 1206, when it was contested between the Nicaea and Trebizond. The city, however, is not mentioned again in Byzantine sources, and presumably fell during the obscure wars of 1225-1231 between Nicaea and the Jandarid emirs of Kastamonu.

Location
Although there were difficulties in precising the location of Malagina, it was facilitated by the discovery of the ruins of Metabole in 1982, by the British archeologist Clive Foss.

References

Sources
 
 
  

Populated places of the Byzantine Empire
Defunct dioceses of the Ecumenical Patriarchate of Constantinople
Archaeological sites in the Marmara Region
Byzantine sites in Anatolia